The Nyay Mandir, which means Temple of Justice, is a piece of Byzantine architecture in India. It houses the District Court of Vadodara city in the state of Gujarat, western India. The central hall is decorated with mosaic tiles and a statue of Chimnabai, the wife of Maharaja Sayajirao Gaekwad III.

Words by His Highness as he laid the foundation  stone for ‘The Maharani Chimnabai Market’ in memory of his queen, "I wish to commemorate the virtues of Her Late Highness and the admiration I entertained for her-the mild, charitable, amiable woman, the devoted mother and loving wife."

Restoration and repair work of historical Nyay Mandir kicked This is for the first time that a major initiative in this direction has been taken by the administration with the help of road and buildings department of the state government.
Parts of the historical building have been damaged and yellow Italian marble tiles on its exterior have started to come off at some places. At several locations, one can see plaster coming off even as the grills of the windows and galleries of the structure are damaged.

Superintending engineer of the department, AK Patel said the renovation was among the work taken up for the golden jubilee celebration of Gujarat's statehood. Patel said the renovation and restoration work would be conducted under expert advice. He said the exterior of the building will be cleaned. Its roof is already being repaired. Patel said the work on the building will be completed by March next year. The restoration and renovation will take care of all the damages to the building so far. The restoration work was kicked off by district judge Atul Vakil. 

Tourist attractions in Vadodara
Baroda State